Skin Traffik is a 2015 British-American action film featuring Mickey Rourke, Daryl Hannah, Eric Roberts, Michael Madsen, Jeff Fahey, Gary Daniels,  Ara Paiaya, Dominique Swain, and Alan Ford.

Plot
When a jaded former hitman encounters a savage pimp and a desperate woman under his control, he embarks on a quest to save a young girl from the clutches of the brutal gangsters who trade human beings as currency.

Cast
 Gary Daniels as Bradley
 Mickey Rourke as Vogel
 Eric Roberts as The Executive
 Daryl Hannah as Zhanna
 Michael Madsen as The Boss
 Ara Paiaya as "X"
 Dominique Swain as Anna Peel
 Alan Ford as Paul Hamilton
 Jeff Fahey as Jacob Andries

Production
The film was shot in Los Angeles, Vancouver, London, Amsterdam, Scotland.

References

External links
 
 

American action films
British action films
Films about human trafficking
Films shot in Los Angeles
Films shot in California
2010s English-language films
2010s American films
2010s British films